Weinmannia spiraeoides was a species of plant in the family Cunoniaceae. It was endemic to Fiji.

References

spiraeoides
Endemic flora of Fiji
Extinct flora of Oceania
Plant extinctions since 1500
Taxonomy articles created by Polbot